Nial Rahil Tanvir (born 1965) is a British astronomer at the University of Leicester. His research specialisms are the Extragalactic distance scale, Galaxy evolution and Gamma ray bursts. Tanvir has featured in various TV programs, including The Sky at Night hosted by Sir Patrick Moore, and Horizon

Tanvir studied Maths and Physics at Durham University (St Aidan's College), graduating in 1986. He was awarded a PhD from the same institution in Cosmology in 1992. He subsequently held a postdoctoral position at Durham before joining the Cambridge University Institute of Astronomy and later the University of Hertfordshire. He was appointed Professor of Astrophysics at the University of Leicester in 2006.

Tanvir headed the international team that discovered the infrared afterglow of  GRB 090423 (detected 2009 April 23), the most distant source recorded to that date.

In 2013 he led a team that discovered so-called kilonova emission accompanying GRB 130603B, which provided the first direct evidence that short-duration gamma-ray bursts are created by merging compact sources, either two neutron-stars or a neutron-star and black-hole.

Honours and awards
In 2002 he was a member of the research group which won the European Union Descartes Prize for their pioneering work on gamma-ray bursts.
He was awarded the Herschel Medal of the Royal Astronomical Society in 2019.

References

External links
 Speakers
 Cosmic blast sets distance mark

1965 births
Living people
People from Derby
Alumni of St Aidan's College, Durham
20th-century British astronomers
Academics of the University of Leicester
21st-century British astronomers